Guruvayur Dorai (born 2 July 1935) is an Indian percussionist. He is one of the most senior exponents of the South Indian classical percussion instrument, the mridangam. He had his initial training under Palghat Subba Iyer and E.P. Narayana Pisharody, and later from the legendary master Palani Subramaniam Pillai.  Initiating his concert performances at the age of eight, Guruvayur Dorai has performed on the concert platform for the past 60 years.  His wide range of efforts in the field of mridangam and music have helped propagate the art around the globe.

Early years 
An exponent of the Pudukottai style of mridangam, Guruvayur Dorai (his real name being Vaidynathan) was born in the temple town Guruvayur, Kerala, to G.S. Krishna Iyer and Meenakshi. His father was a priest and mother, a housewife. He has two brothers and three sisters. His sister Guruvayur Ponnammal was a highly reputed singer at the time. His other sister is a reputed music teacher in Madras, while his brother, G.K.Rajamani is a notable violinist living in Palghat (Kerala).

Young Dorai had a penchant for percussion and was frequently seen drumming on his body with his fingers even while in sleep. Struck by polio at the age of five, his father thought it would be difficult for Dorai to go outside of Guruvayur for higher studies and a job.

There was already a vocalist and a violinist in the family, a mridangist was all that was lacking. So his father decided to sculpt him into one. His father thought Ponnammal, Rajamani and Dorai could give concerts together and that the siblings would take care of Dorai. Moreover, they could make a living out of it.

Dorai began to learn mridangam under the Late Palghat Subba Iyer when he was six. E.P. Narayana Pisharody of Eranallur also taught him at this time. Pisharody's book 'Mridanga Nada Manjari' (a practical study of mridangam) was published by Guruvayur Dorai on 23 September 2001.

The legendary vocalist Chembai Vaidhyanatha Bhagavathar was teaching Ponnammal at that time. Whenever he came to Guruvayur, Chembai used to stay at their house. He took active interest in Dorai's mridangam practice. Dorai had his debut performance (arangetram) at the age of eight, performing with none other than Chembai himself.

1949 was a watershed in Dorai's career, as he came to Chennai for the first time to perform with Chembai in a concert.  Meanwhile, Ponnammal got a chance to sing in a Malayalam film. As the opportunities were more copious in Chennai, their father decided to settle there. Dorai, Ponnammal, Rajamani and the father stayed in a rented house in the city while the rest of the family remained in Guruvayur. In the same year, he also happened to meet the legendary mridangam artist Palani Subramaniam Pillai in Thirupoontharai. After Palani Subramaniam Pillai moved to Madras in 1953, Dorai commenced classes with the maestro. This helped him understand and absorb the complexities of the Pudukottai style of mridangam. Dorai stayed with Palani Subramaniam Pillai in his residence for nearly nine years in the gurukulavasam fashion.

Performances 
Dorai performed with nearly all the eminent artists even at a young age, including Musiri Subramania Iyer, M. D. Ramanathan, Semmangudi Srinivasa lyer, M. S. Subbulakshmi (it was Dorai who performed with her in Carnegie Hall, New York), G. N. Balasubramaniam, Dwaram Venkataswamy Naidu, S. Balachander, Chitti Babu, T. R. Mahalingam, Mysore T. Chowdiah, Palghat Ghatam Sundaram, Alangudi Ramachandran, G. Harishankar and others.

Dorai also accompanied Sr. Vinjamuri Varadaraja Iyengar on multiple occasion to concerts across Andhrapadesh. An excerpt from his interview  - "He encouraged me very much, kept me with him and let me play for him. Apart from that, I gave a lot of kutcheries in Andhra Pradesh. For all those places, Vinjamuri Varadaraja Iyengar took me with him; like Kakinada, Guntur, Tenali, Vijayawada and to many other places he took me with him and introduced me. Because of his taking me with him, those Sabhas/ people got acquainted with me and got to know me". Read More About the Interview

Moreover, he is one of the few mridangists who has performed with nagaswaram wizards, namely T. N. Rajarathnam Pillai (in 1956, Rama Seva Mandali, Bangalore; P. Bhuvaneswariah played violin, Bangalore Venkatram played ghatam, and a khanjira artist was part of the team), Thiruvengadu Subramanium Pillai in 1951, and Namagiripettai Krishnan (from the 1960s onwards).  He has also performed with leading present-day artists including K.J. Yesudas, T. N. Krishnan, T. V. Sankaranarayanan, T. N. Seshagopalan, Neyveli Santhanagopalan, Chitraveena N. Ravikiran Flautist Shashank Subramanyam and others.

Awards
 Sangeetha Kalasikhamani, 2003 by The Indian Fine arts Society, Chennai
 Sangeet Natak Akademi Award 1996
 Kalaimamani, 1990 by the Govt. of Tamil Nadu
 Sangeet Natak Akademi Tagore Ratna 2011

References 

1935 births
Living people
Mridangam players
Musicians from Thrissur
Malayali people
Indian male classical musicians
Indian percussionists
Recipients of the Sangeet Natak Akademi Award
20th-century Indian musicians
Recipients of the Kalaimamani Award
People from Guruvayur